Andrew Asbil (born 1961) is a Canadian Anglican clergyman who has served as 12th Bishop of Toronto since January 2019, succeeding Colin Johnson. His father, Walter Asbil, was Bishop of Niagara from 1991 to 1997.

Life and career
Asbil attended the University of Waterloo and subsequently received his Master of Divinity degree in 1988 from Huron University College in London, Ontario. He was ordained to the priesthood in 1989 and then served the Anglican Church of Canada in the dioceses of Niagara and Toronto.

He was Dean of Toronto from 2016 until his consecration as bishop in September 2018. On January 1, 2019, he became the diocesan bishop and was installed at the Cathedral Church of St. James in Toronto on January 13, 2019.

References

21st-century Anglican Church of Canada bishops
Anglican bishops of Toronto
University of Western Ontario alumni
Deans of Toronto
Living people
1961 births